Spider shot was a variation of chain shot with multiple chains.

See also
Round shot
Heated shot
Canister shot
Grapeshot

References

Projectiles
Artillery ammunition
Balls
Chains
Metallic objects